John Bingham is a footballer who played as a winger in the Football League for Oldham Athletic, Mansfield Town, Chester and Stockport County.

References

1949 births
Living people
People from Ilkeston
Footballers from Derbyshire
Association football wingers
English footballers
Charlton Athletic F.C. players
Manchester City F.C. players
Oldham Athletic A.F.C. players
Mansfield Town F.C. players
Chester City F.C. players
Stockport County F.C. players
English Football League players
English expatriate footballers
Expatriate soccer players in Australia